Viktor Viktorovich Yemelyanov (born 3 July 1987) is a former Russian professional football player.

Club career
He played in the Russian Football National League for FC Spartak-MZhK Ryazan in 2007.

External links
 
 

1987 births
Sportspeople from Ryazan
Living people
Russian footballers
Association football defenders
FC Spartak-MZhK Ryazan players